"Amarsi un po'" is a song composed by Lucio Battisti and Mogol, and performed by  Lucio Battisti. It was released as a single in March 1977, with "Sì, viaggiare" as B-side. The single peaked at first place ten weeks on the Italian hit parade and was the most sold single of the year in Italy. The same year Battisti released an English version of the single for international markets, with the two songs renamed "To Feel in Love" and "Keep on Cruising" and with lyrics by Peter Powell. They were included in the album Images.

"Amarsi un po'" was covered by several artists, notably Mina, Ornella Vanoni, Nek. It also named a film, Amarsi un po' (1984), directed by Carlo Vanzina and starred by Claudio Amendola and Tahnee Welch. In 2017 the song named an episode in the second season of the TV series Master of None, which includes the song in the soundtrack; the song became "a touchstone for the whole season" according to Music supervisor Zach Cowie and the episode was nominated for an Emmy Award for Outstanding Music Supervision.

Track listing
7" single 
 "Amarsi un po'" (Lucio Battisti, Mogol) – 5:07
 "Sì, viaggiare" (Lucio Battisti, Mogol) –  4:10

References

 

1977 singles
Italian songs
Number-one singles in Italy
Songs written by Mogol (lyricist)
Lucio Battisti songs
1977 songs
Songs written by Lucio Battisti